North Durham Academy is a secondary school with academy status based in Stanley in County Durham, England.

The school was formed in September 2011, when Greencroft Business and Enterprise Community School and Stanley School of Technology formally merged.

It opened its new £30 million campus in September 2013, but was not officially opened until March 2014 by the Duke of York, KG.

In 2013 and 2015, Ofsted inspectors rated the academy as 'requires improvement'.

Notable alumni
Liam Dixon (born 1993), cricketer

References

External links
 

Secondary schools in County Durham
Academies in County Durham
Stanley, County Durham